Game Masters: The Exhibition was an exhibition curated by the Australian Centre for the Moving Image (ACMI). The exhibition was designed to highlight the key designers who have had a large influence on video games and video game culture. Following the showing at ACMI, the exhibition began to tour internationally. Conrad Bodman, who also curated Game On, is the curator of the exhibition.

The exhibition included over 125 playable games from over 30 different designers as well as concept and development artwork. Interview events with game designers have been hosted on location by ABC's Stephanie 'Hex' Bendixsen.

International Tour Venues

Games Exhibited
The exhibition showcased the work of over 30 notable video game designers, and featured over 125 playable games including original arcade games that are today hard to find in working condition. Also displayed were concept and development artwork, and interview events with the game designers. The exhibition was divided into three sections: "Arcade Heroes" (highlighting games from the golden age of arcade video games), "Game Changers" (highlighting the works of paradigm-shifting game designers that greatly influenced later designers), and "Indies" (featuring indie games).

References

https://web.archive.org/web/20120317104423/http://www.acmi.net.au/game-masters.aspx

http://gamemasters.acmi.net.au/#!/home/

Art exhibitions in Australia
Exhibitions in Australia
Video game exhibitions
Video gaming in Australia